St. Louis–San Francisco 4003 is a 2-8-2, Mikado type, standard gauge steam railway locomotive built by the American Locomotive Company in 1919 as a standard USRA Light Mikado for the Pennsylvania Railroad. The PRR, for unknown reasons, rejected 33 of 38 locomotives in the order.  The United States Railroad Administration reassigned 23 of them (road numbers 4000-4007 and 4017-4031) to the St. Louis–San Francisco Railway (SLSF), also known as the "Frisco".  The Frisco also received 10 sisters from the Indiana Harbor Belt Railroad (road numbers 4008-4016 and 4032), making 33 in all. The locomotive is now on display at the Fort Smith Trolley Museum in Fort Smith, Arkansas.

The USRA Designs
The railroads of the United States were nationalized during World War I, from December, 1917 to March, 1920.  As part of this, locomotives built during the period were one of the twelve USRA standard designs, which included the Light Mikado.  4003 was one of 625 built by the USRA; another 641 were built after the USRA era, making it one of the most numerous single locomotive designs of all time. After Frisco received the Mikados, it modified them with boosters on the trailing trucks and raised cab roofs for more headroom.

4003
4003 was one of three of the class built by ALCO at its Schenectady Locomotive Works in late summer 1919.  The balance of the class was built by Lima. It cost $53,619.

The Frisco put it into service hauling freight between Fort Smith, Arkansas and Monett, Missouri, which included a stretch through the Boston Mountains that was relatively steep. Two major sources of carloads were berries, a million quarts shipped in 1941, and zinc, which was smelted in Fort Smith.

Like all the other US railroads, the Frisco actively began converting to diesel power in the late forties.  4003 was retired in early 1952, shortly before the last steam powered train on the Frisco, between Birmingham and Bessemer, Alabama in February. Frisco kept the locomotive until 1954 when it donated it to the City of Fort Smith. The city placed it on display in 
Kay Rodgers Park where it remained for almost 50 years.  Early in this century, the city transferred the locomotive to the Fort Smith Trolley Museum with the provision that the museum pay for the moving.  It now sits outside at the museum. While it could probably be restored to operating condition, the museum has no track on which to run it and the restoration cost would be considerable.

The locomotive was added to the National Register of Historic Places in 2004 as 'St. Louis San Francisco (Frisco) Railway Steam Locomotive #4003'.

See also

National Register of Historic Places listings in Sebastian County, Arkansas

References

Sebastian County, Arkansas
4003
2-8-2 locomotives
ALCO locomotives
Railway locomotives on the National Register of Historic Places in Arkansas
Railway locomotives introduced in 1919
Individual locomotives of the United States
USRA locomotives
Standard gauge locomotives of the United States
National Register of Historic Places in Sebastian County, Arkansas
Preserved steam locomotives of Arkansas